Harry Lorenzo Todd (November 6, 1916 – October 9, 1966) was an American professional golfer.

Todd was born in Dallas, Texas. As an amateur, he won the 1939 Western Amateur and finished runner-up to Bud Ward in 1941. He turned professional in 1944.

Todd made his living primarily as a club professional, but did play on the PGA Tour after World War II. He won once, at the 1946 Orlando Open. Also in 1946, he finish one stroke behind Ben Hogan in the inaugural Colonial National Invitation. He led the 1948 Masters Tournament after 36 holes but would finish in a tied for eighth place.

Amateur wins
1939 Western Amateur

Professional wins

PGA Tour wins (1)

Other wins
1947 Ozark Open
1948 Ozark Open
1951 Odessa Pro-Am (with Don January)

References

American male golfers
PGA Tour golfers
Golfers from Dallas
1916 births
1966 deaths